The Saha Institute of Nuclear Physics (SINP) is an institution of basic research and training in physical and biophysical sciences located in Bidhannagar, Kolkata, India. The institute is named after the famous Indian physicist Meghnad Saha.

Previous Directors
 Ajit Mohanty
 Bikas Chakrabarti
 Milan K. Sanyal [2009 to 2014]
 Bikash Sinha
 Manoj K. Pal
 D. N. Kundu
 B. D. Nag Chowdhury
 Meghnad Saha

See also
Education in India
List of colleges in West Bengal
Education in West Bengal

References

External links
  

Research institutes in West Bengal
Research institutes in Kolkata
Homi Bhabha National Institute
Physics institutes
University of Calcutta affiliates
Research institutes established in 1949
1949 establishments in West Bengal